Sammarinese passports are passports issued to citizens of San Marino for international travel.

Application procedure

Applications for a Sammarinese passport are lodged at the Passport Office in San Marino (or, in the case of citizens living overseas, at San Marino diplomatic missions) with the following documents:
 Completed passport application form
 Certificates of birth, citizenship, residence (or relevant self-certification form)
 Certificates of criminal record, pending suit and full civil capacity (to be issued by the Court without stamp duty)
 Two photographs, one of which certified by the Registrar of Vital Statistics (also in this case it is possible to use the self-certification form)

In general, the processing time for a passport application is 15 days.

The application fee is €100 for applicants aged over 14, €50 for applicants aged 3–14 and €30 for applicants aged under 3.

In 2014, Citizens of San Marino had visa-free or visa on arrival access to 151 countries and territories, ranking the Sammarinese passport 16th. It is currently (2018), along with the Serbian passport and the Bosnian passport, one of three European "ordinary" passports to provide visa-free access to China. Of all nationals who can travel visa-free to China, the citizens of San Marino and Bosnia and Herzegovina are granted the longest period of stay (90 days).

See also
Visa requirements for San Marino citizens
San Marino identity card

References

Passports by country
Law of San Marino